The 1994 FIBA Women's World Championship was the 12th edition of the FIBA Women's World Championship, an quadrennial international tournament played by women's basketball teams in FIBA. It was hosted in Australia from 2 to 12 June 1994 at five venues with the Sydney Entertainment Centre hosting the finals.

The tournament consisted of 16 nations from five federations who competed through the regional qualifiers to get to the tournament. These teams were divided into four groups for the preliminary round. Based on the results of the Preliminary round, the teams were then resorted into groups for the quarter-final round, with the top two finishers in each Preliminary group placed into quarter-final Groups A and B, and the bottom two finishers placed into Groups C and D. Based on the placement in the quarter-final round, the teams were then sorted into groups of four, each of which played a two-round knockout draw to determine the final standings.

In the semi-finals, Brazil and China made it through to the final defeating the United States and Australia respectively. In what was the first gold medal final appearance for both teams, Brazil took out the title defeating China 96–87. The United States claimed the bronze defeating Australia 100–95.

Venues
The 1994 edition saw four venues host the games. The Sydney Entertainment Centre was the main venue which hosted the second phase and the finals. The other venues hosted one of the first phase groups with the Derwent Entertainment Centre hosting Group A, Clipsal Powerhouse Group B and D with the Silverdome hosting Group C.

Competing nations

Squads

Preliminary round

In the preliminary round, each team played games against the other three teams in its group. The top two teams in each group were then placed into Groups A and B for the quarter-final Round, while the remaining teams were placed into Groups C and D for the quarter-final Round. Teams placed into Groups A and B for the quarter-final Round were eligible for the Championship bracket, while teams placed into Groups C and D finished no higher than 9th place.

Group A

|}

Group B

|}

Group C

|}

Group D

|}

Quarter-final Round

In the quarter-final Round, each team played games against the other three teams in its group. The top two teams in Groups A and B qualified for the Championship bracket, while the remaining teams from Groups A and B were placed in the bracket to determine places 5 through 9. The top two teams from Groups C and D were placed in the bracket to determine places 9 through 12, and the remaining teams were placed in the bracket to determine places 13 through 16.

Group A

|}

Group B

|}

Group C

|}

Group D

|}

Knockout stage

Championship bracket

5th through 8th place

9th through 12th place

13th through 16th place

Awards

Final standings

References

External links
1994 FIBA World Championship For Women

 
1994
1994 in women's basketball
1994 in Australian basketball
basketball
International women's basketball competitions hosted by Australia
Sports competitions in Sydney
June 1994 sports events in Australia
1990s in Sydney